Inguma (or Mauma, as called in Baigorri) was the god of dreams in Basque mythology and religion.  He was regarded as a malevolent force who entered houses at night and plagued the residents with nightmares.  He also kills people while sleeping.

In popular culture
Inguma is mentioned in "Ofrenda A La Tormenta" ("Offering To The Storm") the third part of the Baztán Trilogy by Dolores Redondo.

References

Basque gods
Dreams in religion
Sleep in mythology and folklore
Basque mythology